Ritteria is a monotypic genus of worms belonging to the family Harrimaniidae. The only species is Ritteria ambigua.

The species is found in Eastern Pacific.

References

Enteropneusta
Monotypic animal genera